Halaqa in Islamic terminology refers to a religious gathering or meeting for the study of Islam and the Quran. Generally, there are one or more primary speakers that present the designated topic(s) of the halaqa while others sit around them (in an approximate circle) and listen. The attendees may participate in the discussions, ask questions, and voice concerns. Usually, prayers and supplications are part of such programs. Also, meals or snacks may be served to the participants.

See also
 Qiyam

References

External links 
 An applied example: The Islamic Halaqas Program of the Bay Area  (Includes photos)

Islamic education
Islamic terminology